This is a list of Spouses of the Presidents of Vietnam (Vietnamese: Phu nhân Chủ tịch nước Việt Nam). The role of the president's spouse is not an official position, and so they are not given a salary or official duties. The position is sometimes informally called First Lady of Vietnam (Vietnamese: Đệ nhất Phu nhân Việt Nam). There have been 10 people holding this title since 1969. The role is currently vacant since the resignation of President Nguyễn Xuân Phúc in January 2023.

Spouses of the presidents of Vietnam

First Ladies of South Vietnam

Notes

References

See also 

 List of presidents of Vietnam
 President of Vietnam
 Spouses of Vietnamese leaders

Vietnam
Spouses of Vietnamese leaders
Lists of Vietnamese people by occupation